This is a list of electoral results for the Electoral district of Merredin in Western Australian state elections.

Members for Merredin

Election results

Elections in the 2000s

Elections in the 1990s

Elections in the 1980s

Elections in the 1970s

Elections in the 1960s

Elections in the 1950s 

 Two party preferred vote was estimated.

References

Western Australian state electoral results by district